The Samsung NX-mount is the lens mount used on NX series mirrorless interchangeable lens cameras by Samsung. The mount was first implemented in the Samsung NX10, and Samsung initially referred to the NX line as 'hybrid digital cameras', citing their combination of attributes of both DSLR and compact cameras.

The mount is designed for APS-C image sensors, with a 1.54x crop factor. Optical image stabilization is featured on some of the lenses, indicated by an "OIS" marking. Automatic focusing on NX lenses is handled by a dedicated electric motor built into the lens.

Samsung NX lenses (with some early exceptions) include i-Function (iFn), which allows control of various camera settings via a ring and button on the lens. NX5 and NX10 cameras support iFn since firmware 1.10 and 1.20 respectively, while all subsequent models support iFn natively.

NX lenses 

Samsung NX lenses are listed in the following sortable table.

Table Notes

Samyang Optics (Bower, Rokinon, Walimex) lenses for NX-mount include:
 MF 8mm 2.8 Fisheye (35mm EFL = 12mm)
 MF 8mm 3.5 Fisheye (35mm EFL = 12mm)
 MF 8mm T3.8 Fisheye (35mm EFL = 12mm)
 MF 10mm 2.8 (35mm EFL = 15mm)
 MF 12mm 2.0 (35mm EFL = 18mm)
 MF 14mm 2.8 (35mm EFL = 21mm)
 MF 14mm T3.1 (35mm EFL = 21mm)
 MF 24mm 1.4 (35mm EFL = 38mm)
 MF 24mm T1.5 (35mm EFL = 38mm)
 MF 35mm 1.4 (35mm EFL = 54mm)
 MF 85mm 1.4 (35mm EFL = 130mm)

Lenses roadmap
Samsung announced plans to launch a 16-80mm 3.5-4.5 OIS VCM (Movie Home) in December 2011.

Three manual focus lenses were announced by Samyang Optics in June, 2010, 8mm 3.5 Fisheye; 14mm 2.8 and the 85mm 1.4. At photokina 2010 event (September 2010), Samyang Optics announced the new 35mm 1.4 available for NX-mount.

Lensbaby announced the availability of its Composer Pro for NX mount with different optics.

Adaptation to non-NX lenses

An adapter for the K-mount lenses has been announced (ED-MA9NXK) by Samsung, and various adapters are produced by Novoflex to adapt lenses made for Nikon F-mount, Canon FD lens mount, Minolta SR mount, Minolta AF, Sony A-mount, Leica R bayonet, Pentax K-mount, Olympus OM system, M42 lens mount, and T2 mount. Various adapters are also available from Kiwifotos.

Due to long flange distance compared to other mirrorless systems, making a telecompressor adapter was more difficult, but in 2017 a crowdsourced NX-L appeared.

Compared with other mounts

See also
Samsung NX-M-mount

References

Lens mounts